10th Anniversary Show may refer to:

EMLL 10th Anniversary Show
10th Anniversary Show: Young Wolves Rising